"The Key" is the fourth episode of the sixth season of the post-apocalyptic horror television series Fear the Walking Dead, which aired on AMC on November 1, 2020, in the United States.

Plot 
John begins to read the letter that he wrote to June. He works to protect the people of the community, and one day on duty, he finds Cameron in the fences eaten by walkers. John begins to investigate the death of Cameron and finds an earring at the scene. Virginia, on the other hand, believes this to be accidental. John joins Strand who is now on the "inter-settlement council." The next day, John explains to Janis that he has a bad feeling about what happened to Cameron.

Virginia and John discuss about the incident, and he shows her an earring that he finds during his investigation, but she asks him to keep it on guard at Cameron's funeral. Suddenly, the Rangers see Janis trying to escape and they capture her. Virginia demands that they search her bag and look for the other pendant. Later, John locks up Janis, and she claims that Ginny is trying to set her up. At dusk, John exhumed Cameron's grave and found a piece of a knife hilt lodged in Cameron's hand.

The next day, John and Strand discuss the handling of weapons. Strand shows him the armory and a knife is missing. Janis declares to Virginia and Strand that she murdered Cameron and is ready for execution. John sits with Jacob for a drink. Suddenly on the road, John hears the sound of a blaring radio and notices a group of walkers are eating someone. As John shoots them all, it is revealed that it is Janis who is devoured by walkers and is divided into two parts. John wants to find out who is responsible for Janis's death and wonders why her execution was brought forward. Strand emerges and asks John to calm down, but John hits him and the two begin to fight. Once the fight is over, Strand declares that he saved both of their lives.

Later, Virginia gives John a key and names him a Ranger, which he accepts. Later, John lies on the bed, when suddenly June arrives and they hug. Elsewhere, Morgan continues on his journey, but suddenly his truck is hit by another vehicle. He wants to make sure Emile's dog is OK, then he walks towards the other car. Two men get out of their vehicle, but as Morgan interrogates them, one of the men wants to know where Emile is. Morgan tells them Virginia knows where he is. The first man says they don't know Virginia and they just want the key that Emile was obtaining for them. Morgan warns them to stay back and that he doesn't want to cause any trouble. They try to fight anyway. He guts one of them, while the other sees the key around Morgan's neck. Morgan stabs him in the chest when he is attacked again. He looks at the key and wonders that this is the thing that the two men were going after.

Reception 

David S.E. Zapanta of Den of Geek! rated the episode 4 out 5, and wrote: "I was surprised they were dispatched so quickly, but it’s just as well. With only four episodes left, Fear still has a lot of ground to cover. Fortunately, this is a journey worth taking." Erik Kain of Forbes in his review praised the development of John Dorie and wrote: "this was a very enjoyable episode of Fear. I liked the mystery aspects. Dillahunt did a great job throughout and John Dorie continues to be one of my favorite characters in any of The Walking Dead shows. Lots of good action both between the living and the dead and between just the living." Writing for Decider, Alex Zalben also acclaimed Dillahunt's performance, writing: "When you get into a John Dorie focused episode, you know what you’re going to get. With a voice like molasses and a generally positive outlook on the zombie apocalypse, episodes like 'Humbug's Gulch' have been a blast to watch."

Ratings 
The episode was seen by 1.28 million viewers in the United States on its original air date, below the previous episodes.

References

External links

 "The Key" at AMC.com
 

2020 American television episodes
Fear the Walking Dead (season 6) episodes